The official 2011/2012 snooker world ranking points for the professional snooker players on the World Snooker Main Tour in the 2011–12 season were based on performances in ranking tournaments over a two-year rolling period. As points were accrued from tournaments in the current season, the points from the corresponding tournaments from two seasons ago were dropped. The total points from the 2009/2010 and 2010/2011 seasons set the rankings at the start of 2011/2012 season and were updated after every ranking tournament. The rankings set the official seedings at the start of the season and at three further points during the season. The total points accumulated by the cut-off dates for the revised seedings were based on all the points up to that date in the 2011/2012 season, all of the points from the 2010/2011 season, and the points from the 2009/2010 season that have not yet been dropped. The total points from the 2010/2011 and 2011/2012 seasons set the rankings at the start of the 2012/2013 season.

Seeding revisions

Ranking points
{| class="wikitable sortable" style="text-align: center;"
|-
! rowspan="2" scope=col class=unsortable | No.
! rowspan="2" scope=col width="35pt" class=unsortable |  Ch 
! rowspan="2" scope=col width="200pt" | Player
! colspan="2" class="unsortable"| Season
! colspan="9" class="unsortable"| Tournament
! class="unsortable"| Season
! colspan="3" class="unsortable"| Cut-off point
! rowspan="2" scope=col | Total
|-
! scope=col | 09/10
! scope=col | 10/11
! scope=col | PTC
! scope=col | AO
! scope=col | SM
! scope=col | UK
! scope=col | GM
! scope=col | WEO
! scope=col | WOO
! scope=col | CO
! scope=col | WC
! scope=col | 11/12
! scope=col | 
! scope=col | 
! scope=col | 
|-

|}

Notes

References

External links 
 2011/12 Official Rankings (Revision One) at Pro Snooker Blog
 2011/12 Official Rankings (Revision Two) at Pro Snooker Blog
 2011/12 Official Rankings (Revision Three) at Pro Snooker Blog
 2011/12 Official Rankings (End of Season) at Pro Snooker Blog

2011
Ranking points 2012
Ranking points 2011